The 1929 Michigan Tech Huskies football team represented Michigan Technological University as an independent during the 1929 college football season. The Huskies compiled another 2–2–1 record.

Schedule

References

Michigan Tech
Michigan Tech Huskies football seasons
Michigan Tech Huskies football